James Dinan Green (September 8, 1798 – August 18, 1882) was a Massachusetts politician who served as a Member of the Massachusetts House of Representatives, a member of the Board of Selectmen and the first, fourth and eighth Mayor of Cambridge, Massachusetts.

Notes

Members of the Massachusetts House of Representatives
Mayors of Cambridge, Massachusetts
1798 births
1882 deaths
19th-century American politicians
Harvard College alumni
Cambridge, Massachusetts City Council members